Medina College is a trust-supported secondary school in Newport on the Isle of Wight, formerly Medina High School.

Medina College may also refer to:

Medina College-Ipil, a school in Ipil, Philippines
Medina College-Pagadian, a school in Pagadian City, Philippines
Medina College-Ozamiz, a school in Ozamiz City, Philippines